The Eastern Illinois Panthers women's basketball team is the basketball team that represents Eastern Illinois University in Charleston, Illinois, United States. The school's team currently competes in the Ohio Valley Conference.

History
Prior to joining the OVC in 1996, Eastern Illinois had won the Gateway Conference tournament in 1988, where they reached what is so far their only NCAA Tournament appearance, which they lost 78–72 at home against Colorado. They have made the WNIT in 2010 and 2013. As of the end of the 2015–16 season, the Panthers have an all-time record of 576–645.

Season Results

Postseason

NCAA Division I
The Panthers have appeared in the NCAA Division I Tournament one time. Their record is 0–1.

WNIT results
The Panthers have appeared in the Women's National Invitation Tournament (WNIT) two times. Their record is 1–2.

AIAW College Division/Division II
The Panthers made one appearance in the AIAW National Division II basketball tournament, with a combined record of 1–1.

Retired Numbers

References

External links